Simon Newcombe (born 11 August 1938) is an Australian rower. He competed in the men's coxless four event at the 1964 Summer Olympics.

References

1938 births
Living people
Australian male rowers
Olympic rowers of Australia
Rowers at the 1964 Summer Olympics
Place of birth missing (living people)
20th-century Australian people